Robert Ian Hughes (born 17 March 1946) is a Welsh former professional footballer who played as a winger. He made appearances in the English Football League for Wrexham and Bradford Park Avenue. He also played for Oswestry Town and Rhyl.

References

1946 births
Living people
Welsh footballers
Association football wingers
Oswestry Town F.C. players
Wrexham A.F.C. players
Bradford (Park Avenue) A.F.C. players
Rhyl F.C. players
English Football League players
Sportspeople from Wrexham County Borough